Kings Island is a  amusement park located in Mason, Ohio. The park is known for releasing record-breaking and first-of-a-kind rides over the years, such as Flight of Fear, the world's first launched roller coaster using a linear induction motor, and The Beast which opened as the world's tallest, fastest, and longest wooden roller coaster in 1979. The Beast still retains the length record and continues to be highly-ranked in the annual Golden Ticket Awards from Amusement Today. With the addition of Mystic Timbers in 2017, Kings Island claimed the world record for having the most wooden roller coaster track in a single amusement park, and it tied the record for most wooden roller coasters, raising the park's total to five.

Kings Island added a  water park called WaterWorks in 1989, constructed near White Water Canyon. The area featured 15 water slides, a lazy river, and a children's play area. After multiple expansions and name changes, the park was eventually renamed Soak City.

For safety reasons, Kings Island publishes a ride rating system that classifies the attractions one through five based on the intensity of the ride, with one representing the calmest rides to five indicating the most aggressive.

Kings Island

Soak City 

Soak City opened in 1989 as WaterWorks, 17 years after Kings Island opened. The following year, the FlowRider, and Pipeline Paradise opened as Wipeout Beach. Six years later, WaterWorks was renamed to Crocodile Dundee's Boomerang Bay Waterpark (later simplified to Boomerang Bay Waterpark). In 2012, the water park was re-branded to Cedar Fair's Soak City. All of the water slides and the lazy river were refurbished. An additional wave pool was also constructed.

See also 

 List of former Kings Island attractions

Notes                                                                                                                                                                                                                      

 Denotes the requirement that guests pay an additional fee for the ride or attraction.

References

External links

 Kings Island official website

|}

Amusement rides lists